L'ira di Achille, internationally released as The Fury of Achilles, is a 1962 Italian historical drama set in the ninth year of the Trojan War and is based primarily on Homer's Iliad.  The film was directed by Marino Girolami and starred Gordon Mitchell as Achilles. It was released in the UK in 1963 as ACHILLES and was filmed in EuroScope and Eastman Color.

Plot
Greeks set sail to Troy, since the prince Paris has abducted the Spartan Princess Helen, wife of Menelaus. In the fighting stands the invincible hero Achilles, who leads his Myrmidons to assault. Now in the tenth year of the war, Troy has not yet been destroyed. For the contention of a slave, Agamemnon, king of the Greeks offends Achilles because of a female slave and the hero withdraws from the war, creating confusion in the army. The Trojans in fact have the opportunity to drive out the Greeks at sea and so Patroclus, Achilles' best friend wears, without the knowledge of Achilles, his divine armor to instill courage in the Myrmidon soldiers. But Patroclus is killed by the Trojan prince Hector: Achilles rages, killing many Trojans, including the same Hector.

Cast
 Gordon Mitchell as "Achilles"
 Jacques Bergerac as "Hector"
 Cristina Gaioni as "Xenia" 
 Gloria Milland as "Briseis"
 Piero Lulli as "Odysseus"
 Roberto Risso as "Paris"
 Mario Petri as "Agamemnon"
 Erminio Spalla as "Nestor"
 Fosco Giachetti as "Priam"
 Ennio Girolami as "Patroclus"
 Tina Gloriani as "Andromache"

Production
The original version includes footage from The Trojan Horse. These scenes are omitted in the UK version which is altogether 20 minutes shorter.

Bibliography

See also
 List of historical drama films
 Greek mythology in popular culture
 The Fury of Achilles - a novel by Gustavo Rodríguez

References

External links
 

1962 films
1960s historical films
Peplum films
Films directed by Marino Girolami
Films scored by Carlo Savina
Films based on the Iliad
Trojan War films
Films set in ancient Greece
Sword and sandal films
Cultural depictions of Achilles
Agamemnon
1960s Italian films